Laç is a town and a former municipality in Lezhë County, northwestern Albania. At the 2015 local government reform it became a subdivision and the seat of the municipality Kurbin. It was the administrative center of the former Kurbin District. The population at the 2011 census was 17,086. Its associated football (soccer) club is KF Laçi.

Laç is served by Laç Railway Station.

Name
Laç means swampy land in Albanian. Similar toponyms in Albania are Laç-Bruç, Kodër-Laç, Përroi i Laçit, Fushë-Laç etc.

Demographic history
Laç is recorded in the Ottoman defter of 1467 as a hass-ı mir-liva property in the vilayet of Kurbin. The settlement had only four households which were represented by the following household heads: Pal Suma, Nikolla Smaka, Gjergj Marku, and Tanush Znishi.

Church of St. Anthony
Known as "Kisha e Laçit" or "Kisha e Shna Ndout" in Albanian, this church is dedicated to St Anthony of Padua.

Notable people
 

Eduin Ujka (born 1995), footballer

See also
Saint Anthony Church
Cave of Saint Blaise

References

Former municipalities in Lezhë County
Administrative units of Kurbin
Towns in Albania